The 2000 MBNA Platinum 400 was the 13th stock car race of the 2000 NASCAR Winston Cup Series and the 32nd iteration of the event. The race was held on Sunday, June 4, 2000, in Dover, Delaware at Dover International Speedway, a 1-mile (1.6 km) permanent oval-shaped racetrack. The race took the scheduled 400 laps to complete. At race's end, Tony Stewart, driving for Joe Gibbs Racing, would complete a dominant performance on the final restart with six to go to win his fourth career NASCAR Winston Cup Series win and his first of the season. To fill out the podium, Matt Kenseth of Roush Racing and Bobby Labonte of Joe Gibbs Racing would finish second and third, respectively.

Background 

Dover International Speedway is an oval race track in Dover, Delaware, United States that has held at least two NASCAR races since it opened in 1969. In addition to NASCAR, the track also hosted USAC and the NTT IndyCar Series. The track features one layout, a 1-mile (1.6 km) concrete oval, with 24° banking in the turns and 9° banking on the straights. The speedway is owned and operated by Dover Motorsports.

The track, nicknamed "The Monster Mile", was built in 1969 by Melvin Joseph of Melvin L. Joseph Construction Company, Inc., with an asphalt surface, but was replaced with concrete in 1995. Six years later in 2001, the track's capacity moved to 135,000 seats, making the track have the largest capacity of sports venue in the mid-Atlantic. In 2002, the name changed to Dover International Speedway from Dover Downs International Speedway after Dover Downs Gaming and Entertainment split, making Dover Motorsports. From 2007 to 2009, the speedway worked on an improvement project called "The Monster Makeover", which expanded facilities at the track and beautified the track. After the 2014 season, the track's capacity was reduced to 95,500 seats.

Entry list 

 (R) denotes rookie driver.

*During the race, Kyle Petty would replace Andretti due to Andretti's rib injuries sustained at the 2000 The Winston.

Practice

First practice 
The first practice session was held on Friday, June 2, at 11:30 AM EST, and would last for one hour and 30 minutes.

Second practice 
The second practice session was held on Friday, June 2, at 1:20 PM EST, and would last for 40 minutes.

Third practice 
The third practice session was held on Saturday, June 3, at 9:30 AM EST, and would last for one hour and 15 minutes.

Fourth and final practice 
The fourth and final practice session, sometimes referred to as Happy Hour, was held on Saturday, June 3, after the preliminary 2000 MBNA Platinum 200 Busch Series race, and lasted for up to an hour.

Qualifying 
Qualifying was split into two rounds. The first round was held on Friday, June 2, at 3:30 PM EST. Each driver would have two laps to set a fastest time; the fastest of the two would count as their official qualifying lap. During the first round, the top 25 drivers in the round would be guaranteed a starting spot in the race. If a driver was not able to guarantee a spot in the first round, they had the option to scrub their time from the first round and try and run a faster lap time in a second round qualifying run, held on Saturday, June 3, at 11:30 AM EST. As with the first round, each driver would have two laps to set a fastest time; the fastest of the two would count as their official qualifying lap. Positions 26-36 would be decided on time, while positions 37-43 would be based on provisionals. Six spots are awarded by the use of provisionals based on owner's points. The seventh is awarded to a past champion who has not otherwise qualified for the race. If no past champion needs the provisional, the next team in the owner points will be awarded a provisional.

Two drivers would fail to qualify: Kyle Petty and Carl Long.

Full qualifying results

Race results

References 

2000 NASCAR Winston Cup Series
NASCAR races at Dover Motor Speedway
June 2000 sports events in the United States
2000 in sports in Delaware